The 2015–16 season of the RBK Kazakhstani Futsal Championship is the 18th season of top-tier futsal in Kazakhstan.

2015–16 season teams

Preliminary round table

Final round

Championship round

League table

Final table

Top scorers
Final round only

See also
2015-16 Kazakhstani Futsal First Division
2015 Kazakhstan Futsal Cup

References

Kazakhstani Futsal Championship
Kazakhstan
2016 in Kazakhstani football
2015 in Kazakhstani football